Under a Velvet Cloak is a fantasy novel by Piers Anthony. It is the last of eight books in the Incarnations of Immortality series. It follows the adventures of the Incarnation of Night.

External links

2007 British novels
Incarnations of Immortality